Frederico Gil was the defending champion, but he lost to Florian Mayer in the semifinal.
Illya Marchenko defeated Florian Mayer 6–4, 6–4 in the final.

Seeds

Draw

Final four

Top half

Bottom half

References
 Main Draw
 Qualifying Draw

American Express - TED Open - Singles
PTT İstanbul Cup